Nature Human Behaviour is a monthly multidisciplinary online-only peer-reviewed scientific journal covering all aspects of human behaviour. It was established in January 2017 and is published by Springer Nature Publishing. The editor-in-chief is Stavroula Kousta, Ph.D. According to the Journal Citation Reports, the journal has a 2021 impact factor of 24.252.

References

External links

Human behavior
Publications established in 2017
Multidisciplinary social science journals
Nature Research academic journals
Monthly journals
Online-only journals
English-language journals